Keys Soulcare is a beauty and wellness lifestyle brand by American singer and songwriter Alicia Keys. It includes a variety of skincare and bodycare products, candles and cosmetics. The brand was launched in December 2020 in the US, early 2021 in the UK, and has since expanded to the North America and other parts of Europe. The company partnered with e.l.f. cosmetics, and was also picked up by Ulta Beauty to be sold in their retail stores across the US. Keys Soulcare was first sold in the United Kingdom with Cult Beauty.

The brand was launched in December 2020 in the US, early 2021 in the UK, and was first sold in the UK with Cult Beauty.

Background 
In September 2020, Keys announced plans of launching her own lifestyle brand, called Keys Soulcare, in 2021. The brand is a joint venture between Keys and cosmetics retailer E.l.f., the latter's chief marketing officer Kory Marchisotto acting as the president of Keys Soulcare. The brands social media was launched on September 22 and website on September 29, 2020. Holiday product preview in took place in December 2020 and the brands first full collection launch was planned for early 2021 in the United States. In an interview with The Guardian Keys shared that her anxiety surrounding what her skin looked like played a large role in developing her skin and body care products. A five-year break from wearing make-up helped provide Keys with the time and perspective needed to develop the products she offers in Keys Soulcare. Keys Soulcare is based on Keys' own skincare journey as she's suffered from skin issues. In an interview with People, Keys explained her inspiration behind the brand:
so much of what we consider beautiful comes from how we feel on the inside. And that is something that I've learned and now honor so much. We're always so focused on the outer just because it's a very physical world. But how does one actually find their way to their soul and to caring for their soul? And that's what led me to this idea of soulcare.

Keys further explained that "I realized that so many people aren't introduced to meditation or positive affirmations or an idea of what you want for yourself and honoring your body, your mind, your spirit" and commented that "it really is a lifestyle". Keys created the cruelty-free products with Renée Snyder, a doctor and board-certified dermatologist. The brand focuses on self-care with products containing clean ingredients and with rituals that encourage self-love.
The products are referred to as offerings, which are paired with rituals meant to be incorporated into one's regimen and the brands skin and body products backages are inscribed with affirmations. The brand was launced in the United Kingdom in early 2021. In April 2021, the brand was launched in France. in March 2022, the brand was launched in Canada.

Products

Overview 
Keys Soulcare offers a variety of skincare, body care and air care products with accessible prices. Keys Soulcare includes products such as body balm, body and hand wash, serum, mask, body oil, body polish, eye cream, candle. Their skincare products to not contain any ingredients restricted by the Food and Drug Administration and European Union Cosmetics Regulation Guidelines.

Initial launch
The line initially launched in December 2020 with three products which were a candle, face cream, and face roller. In January 2021, new products included were cleanser, exfoliator, mask, mist, balm, and skin cream.

Expansion
In June 2021, InStyle announced Keys was expanding products in her skincare line Keys Soulcare to encompass face, neck, and body care products. The new products included hand and body wash, body cream, and body oil and were released on June 8, 2021. Along with the launch of new products, Keys put forth a set of the tips, termed commandments, via Elle of things she does for spiritual and physical health and well-being. With Shape magazine Keys shared a self-love ritual she does every morning that includes admiring herself in the morning for several minutes.

In March 2022, the brand released more skincare products including serum, cleansing balm and soothing and hydrating toner as well as a body massage tool. In September 2022 moisturizer/sunscreen was added to the productline. Peptide serum was added to the line in December 2022.

Cosmetics
In May 2022, Keys Soulcare launched a make-up collection called "Make You”, which includes a complexion brush, brow gel and lip balm, as well as cheek tint.

Promotion
Keys hosted a Keys Soulcare Lounge, a live virtual event, with appearances by Deepak Chopra, Guru Jagat, Rupi Kaur and Swizz Beatz, among others on October 21, 2020. Keys held a live virtual event Keys Soulcare Lounge Ultra Beauty Edition with appearances by actress Tracee Ellis Ross, celebrity hairstylist Jen Atkin, wellness author Ty Alexander and beauty influencer Darryl Dzapasi on February 18, 2021.

Critical reception
According to Women's Wear Daily, "Soulcare has been a leader in the category blending of health, wellness and beauty". The Derm Review noted that "Overall, Keys Soulcare reviews are a mix of positive and negative" at Ulta.com. Woman & Home rated the brand five stars and commented that "Keys Soulcare is not your typical cynical celeb machine; it feels like a well thought out collection from a founder who cares" and according to it "The formulas and packaging punch above their price bracket". Allure wrote that "should definitely consider incorporating Keys Soulcare’s rituals into your regimen. The products are beautiful, the formulations are efficacious yet gentle, and the brand’s messaging — to show your skin and yourself some love — is something we can all get behind". Sheerluxe wrote that "sometimes, celebrity brands can feel disconnected from their mission, but it’s the opposite with Keys Soulcare" beacause "Everything has been designed to tie in with Alicia’s belief in soul-nurturing mantras and love of personal self-care". E! News wrote that with her brand, Keys "is focused on self-care and how that plays a key role in everyone's skincare routine" and "Because of the singer's unique approach to beauty, her brand feels different from what's already on the market.

References

American companies established in 2020